Lepidochitona cinerea, known by the common names common chiton or gray chiton, is a species of chiton, a marine polyplacophoran mollusc in the family Tonicellidae.

Distribution
Lepidochitona cinerea is found in the North Sea and on the coastal region of the Black Sea.

Description
Lepidochitona cinerea is a broadly oval mollusc that grows up to 24 mm long.

References

External links 
 

 

Ischnochitonidae
Molluscs described in 1767
Taxa named by Carl Linnaeus